WINK-TV (channel 11) is a television station licensed to Fort Myers, Florida, United States, serving as the CBS affiliate for Southwest Florida. It is owned by the McBride family and their Fort Myers Broadcasting Company, making it one of a handful of TV stations today to have locally-based ownership. Fort Myers Broadcasting also provides certain services to three Naples-licensed stations under a shared services agreement (SSA) with Sun Broadcasting: CW affiliate WXCW (channel 46), low-power Univision affiliate WUVF-LD (channel 2), and low-power Azteca América affiliate WANA-LD (channel 18). The stations share studios on Palm Beach Boulevard (SR 80) in northeast Fort Myers, while WINK-TV's transmitter is located north of Fort Myers Shores, near the Charlotte–Lee county line.

History
The station began broadcasting on March 23, 1954, owned by the family of taxicab magnate and Cleveland Browns founder Mickey McBride along with WINK radio (1240 AM, later used on 1200 AM; and 96.9 FM). WINK-TV was the first television station in Southwest Florida and is the fifth-oldest surviving station in the state. Although the call letters appear to be an outgrowth of its CBS affiliation, in fact they were simply carried over from its radio sister, which adopted them in 1944—seven years before the CBS Eye made its first appearance. It carried programming from the four major networks of its era: CBS, NBC, ABC and DuMont in the first two decades of its existence. However, it has always been a primary CBS affiliate.

Channel 11 lost DuMont when that network ended operations in 1956. In December 1968, WINK-TV finally gained a local competitor when WBBH-TV signed on and took the NBC affiliation. The two stations continued to share ABC until WEVU-TV (now WZVN-TV) signed on in 1974. However, viewers could watch the full ABC and NBC schedules via stations from Miami–Fort Lauderdale, West Palm Beach and Tampa–St. Petersburg, which were and continue to be available with outdoor antennas.

WINK-TV was a major beneficiary of a quirk in the FCC's plan for allocating stations. In the early days of broadcast television, there were twelve VHF channels available and 69 UHF channels (later reduced to 55 in 1983). The VHF bands were more desirable because they carried longer distances. Since there were only twelve VHF channels available, there were limitations as to how closely the stations could be spaced.

After the FCC's Sixth Report and Order ended the license freeze and opened the UHF band in 1952, it devised a plan for allocating VHF licenses. Under this plan, almost all of the country would be able to receive two commercial VHF channels plus one noncommercial channel. Most of the rest of the country ("1/2") would be able to receive a third VHF channel. Other areas would be designated as "UHF islands" since they were too close to larger cities for VHF service. The "2" networks became CBS and NBC, "+1" represented non-commercial educational stations, and "1/2" became ABC (which was the weakest network then usually winding up with the UHF allocation where no VHF was available).

However, Fort Myers is sandwiched between Miami–Fort Lauderdale (channels 2, 4, 6, 7 and 10) and West Palm Beach (channels 5 and 12) to the east and Tampa Bay (channels 3, 8, 10, and 13) to the north. This created a large doughnut in southwest Florida where there could be only one VHF license. WINK-TV was fortunate to gain that license, and as a result was the only local station that provided a clear picture to outlying portions of the market until cable television arrived in the mid-1970s. Although there was no station on channel 9 in the immediate area, it was occupied in Orlando, which was too close to Fort Myers to reallocate.

The station has identified almost exclusively with its call letters since the mid-1980s. This is due in large part to the extremely high penetration of cable and satellite in Southwest Florida—one of the highest in the nation. Cable and satellite are all but essential for acceptable television reception in much of the market, even in the digital age.

On October 20, 2007, WINK-TV became the first television station in Southwest Florida to begin broadcasting in high definition. In January 2008, several programming changes were made on WINK-TV. It began airing The Early Show (which was replaced by CBS This Morning in January 2012, which in turn was replaced by CBS Mornings in September 2021) in its entirety after CBS began requiring all of its affiliates to air the full two-hour broadcast of the program.

During the landfall of Hurricane Ian on September 28, 2022, the station's studio in downtown Fort Myers was inundated by storm surge flooding from nearby Billy Creek, knocking WINK-TV, WXCW and their sister radio stations off the air. On September 30, WINK-TV returned to the air from a makeshift studio at its transmitter site, though using WXCW's main channel to broadcast the WINK-TV schedule.

Controversy 
On September 28, 2022, WINK-TV staff endured extensive criticism on social media after meteorologist Dylan Federico filmed and tweeted a young cat struggling outside the studio during Hurricane Ian. After extensive criticism focused on the station sharing the video without attempting to help the cat, the staff ultimately attempted to bring the animal inside but failed. The fate of the animal was unknown. Following additional criticism, staff deleted their original tweets featuring the video and Federico disabled responses and chose to hide critical responses on his account.

Programming
Syndicated programs broadcast on WINK-TV include Live with Kelly and Ryan, TMZ on TV, Castle, Inside Edition, and Rachael Ray.

News operation
WINK-TV presently broadcasts 46 hours of locally produced newscasts each week (with 7½ hours each weekday, 3½ hours on Saturdays and five hours on Sundays). WINK-TV operates two news bureaus: the Charlotte County Bureau in the Charlotte Sun newsroom in Charlotte Harbor and the Collier County Bureau in Naples. The Boston Red Sox have held spring training in Fort Myers since 1993, and WINK-TV shares its coverage of the team with fellow CBS station WBZ-TV in Boston. WINK-TV is one of two Fort Myers stations carried by Xfinity in Venice and Wauchula. It is the only Southwest Florida-based station carried on Xfinity's Sebring system.

On May 26, 2011, WINK-TV debuted an hour-long 4 p.m. newscast, one of many added on television stations around the United States on that date to replace The Oprah Winfrey Show, which ended its 25-year run the day before. On June 11, 2011 WINK-TV debuted a 90-minute morning newscast on Saturday and Sunday mornings. WINK-TV also added a half-hour late morning newscast at 10 a.m. on September 6, 2011 (which was later dropped). On September 16, 2013, WINK-TV expanded its weekday morning newscast a half-hour early to 4:30 a.m. and expanded the extension of that program on WXCW by one hour to 7 to 10 a.m. In January 2015, WINK-TV expanded the 6:30 p.m. newscast to weekends on WXCW.

Notable former staff include Hoda Kotb (1989–1991), Trey Radel and Kerry Sanders.

Technical information

Subchannels 
The station's digital signal is multiplexed:

WINK-TV operates the Naples–Fort Myers market's Antenna TV affiliate on its DT2 subchannel (as of March 1, 2019), replacing a standard definition simulcast of the primary/CBS feed that had been airing over that subchannel since 2016, that simulcast having replaced an affiliation with a 24/7 Weather service that aired over WINK-DT2 between 2012 and 2015. As of March 4, 2019, WINK-DT2 also carries the MyNetworkTV programming service on weeknights, filling in programming for all time slots outside of the MyNetworkTV programming schedule with the Antenna TV schedule; the March 2019 relaunch of WINK-DT2 as a dual Antenna TV/MyNetworkTV affiliate restored in-market access to the MyNetworkTV programming service to southwest Florida for the first time since Comcast's July 1, 2015 closure of former cable-exclusive dual MyNetworkTV/This TV affiliate, WNFM-TV.

Analog-to-digital conversion 
WINK has been digital-only since February 17, 2009. It moved its digital signal to UHF channel 50 in mid-2011.

References

External links
WINK-TV official website
Broadcast Center | Fort Myers Broadcasting Co. | Sun Broadcasting, Inc.

CBS network affiliates
MyNetworkTV affiliates
Antenna TV affiliates
INK-TV
Television channels and stations established in 1954
1954 establishments in Florida